Oh Yaara Ainvayi Ainvayi Lut Gaya is a 2015 Punjabi romantic comedy film written and directed by Raj Sinha. It stars Jassi Gill and Gauahar Khan. The film was released on 22 May 2015.

Cast
 Jassi Gill as Ranveer Singh
 Gauahar Khan as Gunjan Kaur
 Rana Ranbir as lawyer 
 Kadambari Jethwani as Jaspreet (cameo appearance)

Opening weekend box office in the UK
In the UK, Oh Yaara Ainvayi Ainvayi Lut Gaya garnered £9,326 in box-office receipts in its opening weekend.

References

External links
 

2015 films
Punjabi-language Indian films
2010s Punjabi-language films
Films scored by Jatinder Shah